Georgia's 4th State Senate district is located in Reidsville, Georgia. It currently doesn't have a Senator since the recent one died while in office.

List of State Senators
Jack Hill 1991 – April 6, 2020

References

http://www.senate.ga.gov/senators/en-US/district.aspx?District=4&Session=27

Government of Georgia (U.S. state)
Georgia Senate districts